Jackie Burns (born October 4, 1980) is an American actress and singer best known for her work in musical theatre.

Early life and education
Born on October 4, 1980, Burns grew up in Middletown, Connecticut and Ivoryton, Connecticut, and in 2002, she graduated from the University of Connecticut with a degree in theatre.

Career
Burns performed in regional theatre at Paper Mill Playhouse, Connecticut Repertory Theatre, and Northern Stage, among other places, for the first six years of her career.

She starred in the 2009 Tony Award-winning Broadway revival of Hair as part of the "Black Boys Trio." Burns also appeared in the original Off-Broadway cast of Rock of Ages.

From July 8, 2010 to June 5, 2011, Burns starred as Elphaba in the first national tour of Wicked, alongside Chandra Lee Schwartz and Amanda Jane Cooper as Glinda. Following her departure from the tour, Burns reprised the role of Elphaba in the Broadway production, replacing Teal Wicks on September 27, 2011. Burns was initially reunited with her former tour co-star Chandra Lee Schwartz as Glinda, and was later paired with Alli Mauzey. She has been praised for her performance as the not-so-Wicked Witch. Her last performance was scheduled to be on February 10, 2013, however she was unable to perform because of an illness. She was succeeded by Dutch theatre star Willemijn Verkaik, who is the only actress to play Elphaba in 3 languages.

Burns recently appeared in the Tom Kitt and Brian Yorkey musical If/Then as the standby for the lead role of Elizabeth (which was played by actress and singer Idina Menzel). The musical, directed by Michael Greif, had its world premiere at the National Theatre in Washington D.C., starting with previews on November 5, 2013, and an official opening on November 24, 2013 before transferring to Richard Rodgers Theatre on Broadway, which began previews on March 4, 2014 and opened on March 30, 2014. Burns' first performance as Elizabeth occurred on May 14, 2014, following intermission (due to Menzel feeling extremely sick during the show's first act). The next three days, Burns went on for the full show. If/Then closed on March 22, 2015.

On January 27, 2016, Burns joined the national tour of If/Then as the full-time Elizabeth replacing Menzel (who played the first 7 cities) in Dallas, Texas. She stayed with the production for the remainder of the run, closing on August 14, 2016.

On July 31, 2017, Burns returned to the role of Elphaba in the Broadway production of Wicked, four and a half years after she had last played the role. She performed opposite former tour co-star Amanda Jane Cooper as Glinda and played her final performance on July 14, 2018. She was succeeded by Jessica Vosk. Burns currently holds the distinction of being Broadway's longest-running Elphaba.

On October 31, 2018, Burns began performances as Elphaba in the second national tour of Wicked, starring opposite Kara Lindsay as Glinda. She performed in San Diego and Los Angeles before playing her final performance in the role to date in Salt Lake City on February 24, 2019. She was succeeded in the role by Mariand Torres.

Credits

Stage credits

Broadway 
If/Then – Elizabeth (Standby) (March 4, 2014 – March 22, 2015)
Wicked – Elphaba (replacement) (September 27, 2011 – February 10, 2013, July 31, 2017 – July 14, 2018)
Hair – Member of Black Boys Trio, Sheila (u/s), Jeanie (u/s), assistant dance captain (2009–2010, Broadway Revival)

Off-Broadway 
Rock of Ages – Swing, Regina (u/s), Justice (u/s) (2008–2009, Original Off-Broadway Production)
Unlock'd (2013)

Tour 
Wicked – Elphaba (replacement) (July 8, 2010 – June 5, 2011, October 31, 2018 – February 24, 2019)
If/Then – Elizabeth (replacement) (January 27, 2016 – August 14, 2016)

Other
A Killer Party: A Murder Mystery Musical, An online musical presented as a webseries - Joan McArther (original)

Television
All My Children, 1 episode
The Late Show with David Letterman, Tribe Member, 1 episode, 2009
Show People with Paul Wontorek, Guest, 1 episode, 2012
Hey Kid: Backstage at If/Then with James Snyder, Herself, 2 episodes, 2014

Film
Set it Up (2018)
The Magnificent Meyersons (2019)

Podcast appearances

Burns appeared on Episode 3 of comedian, Rick Glassman's podcast, ‘Take Your Shoes Off’. (2019)

Awards
Connecticut Critics Circle Award for Best Actress (won)
IRNE Award for Best Actress in a Musical for Wicked (nominated)

References

External links 
 

Living people
American musical theatre actresses
University of Connecticut alumni
1980 births
21st-century American actresses
People from Middletown, Connecticut
People from Essex, Connecticut
Actresses from Connecticut